Jiandeng Xinhua (lit. New Stories Told While Trimming the Wick or New Stories After Snuffing the Lamp; 1378) is an early Ming dynasty collection of Chinese stories by Qu You.  The book consist of 21 stories in 4 volumes.  It was succeeded by a second book Jiandeng Xinhua wai er zhong.

Background and precursors
Jiandeng Xinhua came from a long line of Chinese story collections that goes back to end of the Han dynasty.  Notable Chinese story collections that dates from at least the 3rd century include: Bowuzhi, Soushen Ji, Xijing Zaji, Lieyi Zhuan, A New Account of the Tales of the World, You Ming Lu, Shi Yi Ji, Miscellaneous Morsels from Youyang, Taiping Guangji, Yijian Zhi, etc.  

Some of the most famous Chinese and East Asian folk or fairy tales, such as Li Ji slays the Giant Serpent, Renshi zhuan, The World Inside a Pillow, The Governor of Nanke, The Tale of Li Wa, You Xian Ku, and Hongxian can be found in these collections.

Influence
Jiandeng Xinhua, a major succcess at the time, proved to be highly influential later on, as it directly inspired some of the most popular fictional literature in other places.  It became the model for the first fiction in Korean literature, Kumo Shinhwa, also written in the Chinese language, and it was also the model for the Vietnamese collection Truyền kỳ mạn lục, and the Japanese Ugetsu Monogatari.

References

Ming dynasty literature
Chinese short story collections